Lity may refer to:
 Lity (Orthodox Vespers), a procession at Great Vespers in the Eastern Orthodox Church
 Lity (Orthodox memorial service), a short service for the dead in the Eastern Orthodox Church

See also 
 Liti (disambiguation)
 Leti (disambiguation)
 Lete (disambiguation)
 Lite (disambiguation)